The Mark 16 nuclear bomb was a large thermonuclear bomb (hydrogen bomb), based on the design of the Ivy Mike, the first thermonuclear device ever test fired.  The Mark 16 is more properly designated TX-16/EC-16 as it only existed in  Experimental/Emergency Capability (EC) versions.

The TX-16 was the only deployed thermonuclear bomb which used a cryogenic liquid deuterium fusion fuel, the same fuel used in the Ivy Mike test device. The TX-16 was a weaponized version of the Ivy Mike design. This required both a considerable reduction in weight of the explosive package and the replacement of the elaborate cryogenic system with vacuum flasks for replenishing boiled-off deuterium. The carrier aircraft was to be the B-36 as modified under Operation Barroom.
Only one B-36 was so modified. The TX-16 shared common forward and aft casing sections with the TX-14 and TX-17/24 and in the emergency capability (EC-16) version was almost indistinguishable from the EC-14. A small number of EC-16s were produced to provide a stop-gap thermonuclear weapon capability in response to the Russian nuclear weapons program. The TX-16 was scheduled to be tested as the Castle Yankee "Jughead" device until the overwhelming success of the Castle Bravo "Shrimp" test device rendered it obsolete.

Specifications
Design yield was 6-8 megatons of TNT.

Manufacture and service
Five units were manufactured in January 1954, and deployed in an interim "emergency capability" role with the designation EC-16.

By April 1954 they were all retired, as the alternative solid-fueled thermonuclear weapons had been tested successfully.  These solid fuel thermonuclear bombs were far easier to handle, requiring no cryogenic temperature materials or cooling system.  It was replaced with the five EC-14 weapons brought up to an acceptable standard as the TX-14 and production Mark 17 nuclear bombs in mid-1954.

The planned test of the TX-16 bomb in the Castle Yankee test of Operation Castle was canceled due to the spectacular success of the "Shrimp" device in the Castle Bravo test.

See also
 List of nuclear weapons

References

* Hansen, Chuck, "Swords of Armageddon: U.S. Nuclear Weapons Development since 1945" (CD-ROM & download available). PDF-2.67 Mb. 2,600 pages, Sunnyvale, California, Chucklea Publications, 1995, 2007.  (2nd Ed.)
O'Keefe, Bernard J. "Nuclear Hostages," Boston, Houghton Mifflin Company, 1983, .

Cold War aerial bombs of the United States
Nuclear bombs of the United States